A flat shot in tennis is made by striking the ball at a neutral level.  Unlike the backspin and topspin the ball is hit with a swipe at neutral level. This effect is created by driving through the ball to push it forward rather than brushing up or down the back creating spin.  The shot is commonly used for power and helps quicken the pace on the ball during play.

Uses of the Flat Shot
Flat shots have many applications in tennis, particularly on the serve.

The flat serve is most often used for a first serve, due to its speed and little room for error. Most flat serves fly straight through the air and bounce relatively medium-low in comparison to other types of serves. They are characterized by their speed and placement. A good flat serve should be aimed along the center of the court, where the net is lowest, in order to maximize chances of landing the serve. Although the placement of this serve is generally the same, its speed at arrival is often used to generate aces or service winners. Many professional players utilize strong flat serves, such as Robin Söderling and Andy Roddick.

Advantages of the Flat Shot
 Power
 Good for tricking opponents that expect other shots
 more force Which causes giving less time fore opponent to react

Disadvantages of the Flat Shot
 Smaller margin for error
 Little to no spin
 Gives little time for player to get set-up
 Requires skill
 Requires adequate ability to hit with power

Some of the notable players who usually use flat groundstrokes
 Chris Evert
 Monica Seles
 Serena Williams (Although she currently employs more variety of spins in her shots, at the beginning of her career she was a master of flattening out her shots and is still near the top when it comes to this ability)
 Maria Sharapova
 Venus Williams
 Petra Kvitová
 Andy Roddick
 Fernando González
 Ivo Karlović
 James Blake
 Jimmy Connors
 Miloslav Mečíř
 Nikolay Davydenko
 Robin Söderling
 Andy Murray
 Tomáš Berdych
 Lukáš Rosol
 Roger Federer (More so at the beginning of his career, possessed the remarkable ability to flatten out his shots with extreme precision. Near this point in his career he hits with spin much more frequently)
 Novak Djokovic (More so at the beginning of his career. At this point in his career he hits his forehand with much more spin)
 Karolína Plíšková

Tennis shots